The black-billed brushturkey, yellow-legged brushturkey or black-billed talegalla (Talegalla fuscirostris) is a species of bird in the family Megapodiidae. It is found in the Aru Islands and New Guinea. Its natural habitat is subtropical or tropical moist lowland forest.

References

black-billed brushturkey
black-billed brushturkey
Taxonomy articles created by Polbot